Samantha Felisha Thornhill is a poet, author, educator and producer from the island nation of Trinidad and Tobago.

Biography
Thornhill's interest in poetry began in 6th grade when she wrote a poem about Christmas in Trinidad. This established a connection with her Trinidadian roots. She attended Wellington High School in West Palm Beach, Florida, where she was assisted by her 10th grade English teacher to develop her writing skills. Thornhill later began to contribute to the school's literary magazine, Poetry Justice. By her senior year, she became the editor-in-chief of the magazine. She attended Florida State University in Tallahassee (2002), where she majored in English with a concentration in Creative Writing, and a minor in Black Studies. This was during a period when the English Department had its highest concentration of black professors, which contributed to her growing knowledge and also led to her meeting some other black poets such as Gwendolyn Brooks and Rita Dove. While in college, she became interested in the spoken word. While performing at FSU, she caught the attention of Keith Rogers, the leader of the local Black Talk poetry troupe. Rogers invited her to perform at the Black on Black poetry reading event, where he was impressed by her writing. She was invited to become a member of Black Talk, launching her career in the spoken word. After graduating with an MFA in poetry from the University of Virginia (2004), she moved to New York City, where she has taught poetry to actors at the Juilliard School.

Works

Books
 Poetry: Watch Me Swing, Red Beard Press, 2011
 Picture Book: Odetta, Queen of Folk, Scholastic Books, 2010
 Chapter Book: Everybody Hates School Presentations, Simon & Schuster, 2007

Articles and reviews
 The Juilliard Journal, Vol. XXIV No. 1, Sept 2008: “An Affair to Remember (Article)
 Black Issues Book Review, March-Aprii 2006 “Tupac Shakur” (Article)
 Black Issues Book Review, March–April 2005: “A Soulful Place for Poetry.” (Article)
 Black Issues Book Review, March–April 2005: “Star Poets and Poet Stars: The Rise of the Celebrity Bard.” (Article)
 Black Issues Book Review, March–April 2005: “In the Key of Life” (Review)
 Meridian, Spring 2005 “Kyle Dargan’s The Listening.”(Review)

Awards & fellowships
 Brooklyn Arts Council Grant, 2014 
 Funds for Teachers Travel Grant, Cuba, 2012 
 University of Missouri Grant for Summer Seminar in Greece, 2011
 Squaw Valley Community of Writers Scholarship, 2009
 Jerome Foundation Travel Grant, 2008
 Hedgebrook Retreat for Women Writers Residency, 2008
 Soul Mountain Writing Fellowship, 2004
 Archie D. & Berth H Walker Scholarship, Fine Arts Work Center in Provincetown, MA, 2003
 Cave Canem Fellowship, 2006, 2004, 2003
 Henry Hoyns Writing Fellowship, University of Virginia, 2002-2003
 Mart P. Hill Honors Thesis Award, Florida State University, 2002
 Cody Harris Poetry Award, Florida State University, 2002

References

External links
Samantha Thornhill's website

Year of birth missing (living people)
Living people
21st-century American poets
American women poets
University of Virginia alumni
Juilliard School faculty
21st-century American women writers
Women music educators